Wilkanowo  (formerly German Wittgenau) is a village in the administrative district of Gmina Świdnica, within Zielona Góra County, Lubusz Voivodeship, in western Poland.

Sights
Bismarck Tower, Zielona Góra, which despite its name is actually in Wilkanowo

References

Wilkanowo